Dave's Picks Volume 37 is a three-CD live album by the rock band the Grateful Dead. It contains the complete concert recorded on April 15, 1978, at the College of William & Mary in Williamsburg, Virginia, as well as selections from the April 18 concert at the Civic Arena in Pittsburgh, Pennsylvania. It was released on January 29, 2021, in a limited edition of 25,000 copies.

Critical reception 
On AllMusic, Timothy Monger wrote, "The ongoing Grateful Dead archival series Dave's Picks offers up its 37th volume with a fairly rollicking show from the spring of 1978. Recorded by the inimitable Betty Cantor-Jackson, Vol. 37 finds the band at Williamsburg, Virginia's College of William and Mary on April 15th where they chug through two lengthy sets of highlights..."

Track listing 
Disc 1
First set:
"Mississippi Half-Step Uptown Toodeloo" (Jerry Garcia, Robert Hunter) – 10:43
"Passenger" (Phil Lesh, Peter Monk) – 4:52
"Friend of the Devil" (Garcia, John Dawson, Hunter) – 7:04
"El Paso" (Marty Robbins) – 4:53
"Brown-Eyed Women" (Garcia, Hunter) – 5:30
"Let It Grow" (Bob Weir, John Perry Barlow) – 14:32
"Deal" (Garcia, Hunter) – 7:15
Second set:
"Bertha" > (Garcia, Hunter) – 6:01
"Good Lovin'" (Rudy Clark, Arthur Resnick) – 7:04
"Candyman" (Garcia, Hunter) – 7:39
Disc 2
"Sunrise" > (Donna Jean Godchaux) – 4:12
"Playing in the Band" > (Weir, Mickey Hart, Hunter) – 14:25
"Rhythm Devils" >  (Hart, Bill Kreutzmann) – 11:40
"Not Fade Away" > (Norman Petty, Charles Hardin) – 13:30
"Morning Dew" (Bonnie Dobson, Tim Rose) – 10:47
"Around and Around" (Chuck Berry) – 8:41
Encore:
"One More Saturday Night" (Weir) – 4:59
Bonus tracks – April 18, 1978:
"Lazy Lightning" > (Weir, Barlow)– 4:06
"Supplication" (Weir, Barlow) – 5:58
Disc 3
"Sugaree" (Garcia, Hunter) – 15:02
"Tennessee Jed" (Garcia, Hunter) – 9:11
"Scarlet Begonias" > (Garcia, Hunter) – 13:51
"Dancing in the Street" > (William "Mickey" Stevenson, Marvin Gaye, Ivy Jo Hunter) – 13:33
"Rhythm Devils" > (Hart, Kreutzmann) – 1:16
"Samson and Delilah" (traditional, arranged by Weir) – 7:23
"Terrapin Station" (Garcia, Hunter) – 10:59
"Around and Around" (Berry) – 8:34

Note: The song list for the April 18, 1978 concert at the Civic Arena in Pittsburgh, Pennsylvania was:

First set: "New Minglewood Blues" · "Sugaree" · "Looks Like Rain" · "Dire Wolf" · "Beat It On Down the Line" · "Loser" · "El Paso" · "Tennessee Jed" · "Lazy Lightning" · "Supplication"

Second set: "Scarlet Begonias" · "Dancing in the Street" · "Rhythm Devils" · "Samson and Delilah" · "Terrapin Station" · "Around and Around"

Encore: "U.S. Blues"

 Included in Dave's Picks Volume 37
 Partially included in Dave's Picks Volume 37

Personnel 
Grateful Dead
Jerry Garcia – guitar, vocals
Donna Jean Godchaux – vocals
Keith Godchaux – keyboards
Mickey Hart – drums
Bill Kreutzmann – drums
Phil Lesh – bass
Bob Weir – guitar, vocals
Production
Produced by Grateful Dead
Produced for release by David Lemieux
Mastering: Jeffrey Norman
Recording: Betty Cantor-Jackson
Art direction, design: Steve Vance
Cover art: Helen Rebecchi Kennedy
Photos: James R. Anderson, Bob Minkin, Rob Bleetstein
Liner notes essay: Rob Bleetstein

Charts

References 

37
Rhino Records live albums
2021 live albums